Daxuecheng Station, University Town Station, Higher Education Mega Center Station or related may refer to:

 Daxuecheng station (Chongqing Rail Transit)
 Daxuecheng station (Jinan Metro)
 Daxuecheng station (Tianjin Metro)
 University Town Station (Shenzhen)
 University Town Station (Kunming)
 Higher Education Mega Center South Station (Guangzhou)
 Higher Education Mega Center North Station (Guangzhou)
 Liangxiang University Town Station (Beijing)
 Liangxiang University Town North Station (Beijing)
 Liangxiang University Town West Station (Beijing)
 Songjiang University Town Station (Shanghai)